The Park Theatre was a playhouse in Brooklyn, New York City, located on 381–383 Fulton Street. Built in 1860 and opened in 1863, the Park Theatre was the oldest playhouse in Brooklyn until it was destroyed by fire on November 12, 1908.

References

1860 establishments in New York (state)
1860s in New York City
1908 disestablishments in New York (state)
1908 in New York City
19th century in Brooklyn
1908 fires in the United States
Buildings and structures demolished in 1908
Burned buildings and structures in the United States
Demolished theatres in New York City
Demolished buildings and structures in Brooklyn
Theatres completed in 1860
Theatres in Brooklyn